Yasin Haji Mohamoud Hiir also known as Faratoon is a Somali politician, and is a member of Somaliland's Lower House of Parliament (House of Representatives). Prior to his election as a member of Somaliland's House of Representatives in May 2021, Faratoon served as the Foreign Minister of Somaliland. He formerly served as the Education and Science Minister of Somaliland. He also served as the Minister of Interior of Somaliland.

See also

 Ministry of Interior (Somaliland)
 Ministry of Foreign Affairs (Somaliland)
 Ministry of Education (Somaliland)
 List of Somalis

References

|-

|-

People from Hargeisa
Peace, Unity, and Development Party politicians
Living people
Education Ministers of Somaliland
Foreign Ministers of Somaliland
Interior Ministers of Somaliland
Government ministers of Somaliland
1948 births